Tobian (literally "the language of Tobi") is the language of Tobi, one of the Southwest Islands of Palau, and the main island of Hatohobei state. Tobian is a Micronesian language spoken by approximately 150 people, about 22 are native speakers. The speakers are located in either the island of Tobi or in Echang, a hamlet of Koror, the former capital of Palau. Tobian and Sonsorolese are very close, and appear to be gradually merging towards a new dialect called "Echangese". Earlier in the 20th century, about 1000 people lived on the island. Shortly before and during the First World War, those numbers dropped severely due to an abundance of disease.

Classification 
Tobian and the dialects of Sonsorol, Merir, and Pulo Ana, the other inhabited Southwest Islands, are closely related to the languages spoken in the Federated States of Micronesia outer islands of Yap and Chuuk Lagoon. These include Ulithi and the Central Carolines. Altogether, these languages form a sub-group within the Micronesian languages. The names of these dialects are the terms that are commonly used in European terms. Below are the native names as compared to the common names:

Tobi is the basis of a local pidgin.

Examples
 animal = mar
 coconut palm = ruh
 goodbye = sabuho
 language = ramarih
 soldierfish = red

Counting
 one = sewo
 two = huwou
 three = soruo
 four = fauwo

This is only base counting. There are different numerals for a lot of different objects.

Phonology

Vowels 

"œ" is used rarely and sounds similar to the French "eu" but the lips do not round out at the end of the sound and has critical meaning in words. There is a central low vowel that sounds like the "u" in "but", but it does not have semantic value and it has very rare occurrence.

Diphthongs 
There are a lot of diphthongs in Tobian and according to Capell, "several of them are difficult for Europeans".

äe     as in     mäe: breadfruit

äi                   fäivi: woman

aḛ                  wa′ŋaḛt: then

ai                   maik: swordfish

a:i                  ms:il, forehead decoration

ao̯                 wao̯: top

au                 jau: needle, 

sauruai: my friend

a:u                sa:u: piece

ei                  lei: agent of action

oʉ                 woʉ: rather of house

øi                  røi: coconut oil

øʉ                Pannøʉ: Palau

Homonyms and Near Homonyms 
Like most other languages, Tobian has examples of homonyms but they are not as abundant. Meanings can vary solely on vowel length. Also small differences in sounds can produce major differences in meanings. For example, the difference between voiceless (f) and voiced (v) consonants are important but there are many exceptions where it does not affect the meaning.

ŋøŋa       1. to chew betelnut     2. a stick used in weaving

ʉl            1. a lobster                  2. to pull, drag

taitai        1. to excel, precede    2. to shave

Differences In Sounds 
mäk: tatooing              as compared with     ma: kind of garnish

′pannʉ: coconut leaf                                    Pannøʉ: Palau

i′te: my name                                               i′tøʉ?: who?

teiføʉ: thirsty                                                taivøʉ: new

ŋøs: tired                                                      ŋo̯s: glans penis

Accents Of Words And Sentences 
Tobian utilizes both stress and pitch accents or tones. Compared to the other dialects, it uses less musical tone. It is not a tonal language because the tone does not change the meaning of the word. Although it is not tonal, the speech has a wide variety of tone variations that appear to be emotional rather than linguistic and either show emphasis or other semantic components. Stress accents are used but not as much as English or Russian. In the past, the stress marks would normally be placed on the last syllable of the words. In the present, the stress marks can be placed either on the last syllable or the second to last syllable.

 Accent on the Penultimate (Second to last)
 Accent on the Final Syllable
 Accent on the Antepenultimate (Third to last)
 Sentence Stress
 Vowel Harmony
 Vowel Length
 Furtive Vowels (Slightly heard or silent vowels)

Consonants

References

External links

Tobian language at Friends of Tobi Island
Open access recordings of Hatohobei word lists, paradigms and narratives are available through Kaipuleohone

Chuukic languages
Languages of Palau
Hatohobei
Endangered Austronesian languages